Irene Moors (born 18 June 1967, Alkmaar) is a Dutch comedian, TV personality, singer, and host.

Career 
Her career took off in 1989 with RTL 4's Telekids, co-starring Carlo Boszhard, turning them both into TV icons of the Netherlands.

In 1995, she topped the Dutch charts for six consecutive weeks with the single No Limit by Irene Moors & de Smurfen.

Filmography

Notes

External links 

1967 births
Living people
Dutch women comedians
Dutch television producers
Dutch women television producers
Dutch women television presenters
People from Alkmaar